These are characters from the Dollhouse science fiction television series.

Actives/Dolls
The Actives from the Los Angeles Dollhouse are given names derived from the NATO phonetic alphabet.

Echo

Echo (Eliza Dushku), formerly Caroline Farrell, is an Active and protagonist of the series. She is one of the most popular Actives in the Dollhouse and, during the course of her engagements, has shown skills that transcend the limitations of her parameters. Echo has become increasingly self-aware during her blank state, remembering facets of her previous engagements, recognizing that she can be imprinted with different personalities, and remembering facts from her previous life such as her name. Prior to having her mind wiped, Echo was a college activist named Caroline Farrell who attempted to expose the Rossum Corporation.

Sierra

Sierra (Dichen Lachman), real name Priya Tsetsang, is an Active in the Los Angeles Dollhouse. Priya is Chinese-Australian, though she frequently has an American accent in her mind-wiped state. In her mind-wiped state, she is instinctively drawn to Echo but lacks Echo's self-awareness. Before coming to the Dollhouse, she sold her own artwork at a stall on Venice Beach. She was seduced by Nolan Kinnard, a Rossum Corporation researcher, who commissioned her to do a large painting. At a showing of her art in Kinnard's house, he made advances towards her at the show, but she publicly rejected him. Humiliated and discouraged, he began giving her antipsychotic drugs, which induced a paranoid schizophrenic state.  She was then transferred to a mental health clinic, before being inducted into the Dollhouse.  During her time in the Dollhouse, Sierra fell in love with Victor, a fellow Doll.

Victor

Victor (Enver Gjokaj), formerly Anthony Ceccoli, is an Active who has made friends with Echo and Sierra.  He is an Afghanistan War veteran whose PTSD was cured by the Dollhouse.  The character is introduced as Russian gangster Lubov, whose real identity as a Doll is revealed later. The character is also regularly hired out on romantic engagements for one "Miss Lonelyhearts". Prior to the Dollhouse, Victor seems to be a baseball fan, as he is able to recite the entire New York Mets line-up in "Needs". In his mind-wiped state, he is inexplicably attracted, physically and emotionally, to Sierra. His handler's name is Selena Ramirez. In "Briar Rose", he suffers facial cuts similar to Dr. Saunders after Alpha invades the Dollhouse. In the early episodes of the second season, however, surgery has removed all the scars from his face. His romantic attraction to Sierra continues to recur both in his blank states and personas throughout season two. His origin is revealed in "Stop-Loss", where his five-year contract with the Dollhouse expires and he is released into his original identity; Rossum, however, kidnaps him for their private army of supersoldier ex-Actives. Echo and Priya save him from the Rossum training facility, and all three are condemned to "the Attic." They later escape and solidify their alliance with Adelle DeWitt, Boyd Langton, Paul Ballard and Topher Brink against Rossum's ambitions.

Whiskey
Whiskey (Amy Acker) was the number one Doll before her face was scarred by Alpha so that Echo could take the top spot. To accommodate the loss of their existing physician and to not let the damaged Doll go to waste, Topher created the identity Claire Saunders for Whiskey. After some taunting from Alpha and through computer skills she was mysteriously imprinted with, Claire was able to realize she is really Whiskey. She did not express an interest to discover who she was prior to this, proclaiming, "I know who I am." Three months later, in "Vows", she is seen pulling pranks on Topher. She eventually tries to seduce him, but is rejected. The two discuss her identity as Claire Saunders, and how Topher tried to make her as a foil to himself so they could see each other's mistakes to reduce the chance that "someone would get hurt". At the end of the episode, she is seen driving away from the Dollhouse, despite her fear of the outside world. She returns to the dollhouse in "Getting Closer", claiming to have been with Boyd for the past few months. Later in the episode, she fatally shoots Bennett Halverson then calmly walks away, leaving the Dollhouse and causing Ballard and Echo to conclude that Rossum imprinted her as a sleeper active. In "The Hollow Men", she reveals that she has been imprinted as Clyde Randolph. In the future events of 2019 seen in "Epitaph One", Whiskey remains in the abandoned Dollhouse, seemingly as its benign caretaker, having reverted to her Doll-state. By this time, she has lost her scars.

November
November (Miracle Laurie), whose real name is Madeline Costley, is originally introduced to the series as Mellie, the neighbor, romantic interest, and confidante of Paul Ballard. November is in fact a "sleeper" Active. Adelle can switch November to a combat-ready personality using verbal codes. In Omega, November's original persona and memories are restored and she is released from her contract early with full payment at the request of Paul Ballard, in exchange for him joining the Dollhouse's staff; she returns to her life as Madeline Costley, in which she had a deceased daughter named Katie. November's character was originally conceived as an Active who got fewer of the criminal gigs and more of the personal ones. Whedon originally stated that the character would not be included in the show and that "the show simply moves too fast now for me to do what I wanted with her", but later hinted that the character might emerge later in the series.

During the second season, Madeline was approached by Senator Daniel Perrin with evidence of her time in the Dollhouse, and being very disturbed by what she saw, she was encouraged to testify before the Senate regarding her involvement.  However, since Sen. Perrin had been implanted with doll architecture and was being controlled by the Washington D.C. Dollhouse, he was made to state that the Dollhouse was an urban legend and that Madeline was delusional and would receive psychiatric care. She was then abducted and reprogrammed by the Washington D.C. Dollhouse.

Later on November is rescued by Paul when he and Victor invade the D.C. Dollhouse in order to kidnap Bennet who is supposed to help them reconstruct Caroline's wedge. During her stay Adelle has her imprinted with her Mellie personality in order to avoid further complications and because she insists that unlike Madeline, Mellie trusts Paul. Although this time Mellie is aware of her doll status. When Rossum invades, Mellie flees along with the others only to invade Rossum in a bid to take the organization down. She and Paul manage to cause a lot of damage to Rossum's computer systems before Boyd plays a tape of Adelle activating Mellie's sleeper programing. Mellie proceeds to attack Paul who pleads with her to regain control, which she briefly manages. Once she realizes what a threat she poses to Paul, and that she cannot retain control of her body she commits suicide, sacrificing herself in order to save him, confessing that he made her feel like "a real person".

Alpha
Alpha (Alan Tudyk), formerly Carl William Craft, is a rogue Active who escaped the Dollhouse. Before coming to the Dollhouse, he was a prisoner convicted of kidnapping and attempted murder. When the Dollhouse was starting up, it needed "guinea pigs"; he was able to reduce his sentence by agreeing to become an Active for five years. He becomes enamored with Echo once she enters the Dollhouse, and eventually attacks Whiskey so that Echo may become the most requested Doll. An accident causes a "composite event", in which 48 personalities are simultaneously imprinted on Alpha, along with the associated memories and skill sets. In his escape, he killed several Dolls and Dollhouse staff members, including Echo's previous handler, yet he let Echo live. After his escape from the Dollhouse, Alpha begins to send anonymous packages to Paul Ballard, hinting at the existence of the Dollhouse and at Echo's former identity. Alpha reveals himself after posing as former Los Angeles Dollhouse architect Stephen Kepler, whom Ballard has tracked down. He leads Ballard into the Dollhouse, takes control of the security and automated systems, and leaves with Echo. Though Echo escapes him, he remains at large, and Ballard is sent by the Dollhouse to track him down.

In the second season, Alpha returns, killing all who ever hired Echo as a serious romantic partner, save for one: Internet billionaire Joel Miner. Alpha would later leave a message via an imprinted Sierra, and this causes DeWitt to order a full rewiping of all Actives; this was predicted by Alpha, who breaks into the Dollhouse and activates a device that triggers the inset coding from the full rewipes for the Actives to attack any on sight. Capturing the client they held in Dollhouse for his own safety, he holds him hostage until Ballard gets to the chair room, where Alpha reveals his master plan; take apart Ballard's mind to discover what made Echo love him. Ultimately through the process he destroys Ballard's brain, rendering him brain dead, while forming an imprint of Ballard. Alpha imprints himself with Ballard, as Echo walks in, and they fight after Echo rejects Alpha once again. During the fight Ballard's personality surfaces and takes control and begs Echo to kill him, but she is unable to and Alpha escapes.

In the future of "Epitaph One" (2019), Caroline, who has now been restored to her original self, returns to the House with Paul to take the Actives to Safe Haven. During a conversation with Dr. Saunders, she says that the imprinting technology doesn't travel, and that "we have Alpha to thank for that". One year later, during the events of Epitaph Two: Return, Alpha is revealed to be running a revived Dollhouse for "dumbshows", or those who were wiped and not given a replacement personality by Rossum. He later leaves the safety of the Dollhouse for fear that he may return to his original unstable personality and be a danger to the others, although Echo finds this unlikely, believing him to be "evolved" like herself. His fate is left unknown, but as a final act, he leaves a copy of Ballard's personality for Echo.

Other actives
Charlie is a male Active mentioned in Epitaph One who gives Priya/Sierra her 'birthmark' tattoo.

Foxtrot is a female Active mentioned in Echoes who was accidentally programmed by Topher to speak Mandarin Chinese instead of Cantonese.

Juliet is a female active mentioned in "Epitaph One".  She is one of many actives who shelter in the LA Dollhouse building after the collapse of civilization. She entertains the others with stories of her dreams.

Kilo (Maurissa Tancharoen) is a female Active brought in by Topher in the episode "The Public Eye" to demonstrate the effects of the "Disruptor".  She later becomes a 'tech head' soldier, fighting under Victor's command in "Epitaph Two: Return".

Mike (Teddy Sears) is an Active who first appears in Needs. He shares a room with Echo, November, Sierra, and Victor. Along with his roommates in "Needs", he was imprinted with his original personality.  He expressed symptoms of paranoid schizophrenia, believing he and his fellow Actives were caught in the clutches of a malign extraterrestrial experiment.

Quebec (David Law) is an Active first introduced in "Needs". He is first seen returning from an engagement as an army soldier claiming to have seen a man die.

Romeo is a male Active seen briefly on a screen in Topher's lab in "Belle Chose". Romeo is one of Anthony/Victor's squad in "Epitaph Two: Return", but it's not clear whether this is the same Active.

Tango (Emma Bell) is an Active introduced in "Needs". She eats breakfast with Echo and Mike. She eventually is imprinted with the personality of a cabaret dancer, causing Caroline to go back into the Dollhouse in order to save the Actives from what she sees as a form of prostitution and slavery. Originally, "there had been an entire early subplot about an active named Tango who was an older woman", but this was dropped when the network decided the Actives should all be young and fit.

Yankee is a female Active seen briefly on one of Topher's screens in "Belle Chose".  Another, male Yankee is seen in "Epitaph Two: Return", as one of Victor's soldiers.

Active call signs seem to be reused.  Reference is made to other dolls designated 'November' and 'Sierra', and DeWitt suggests using Ballard as a replacement Victor now that Anthony has been returned to society.

Actives from the Washington D.C. dollhouse
Aphrodite is an Active mentioned in "The Left Hand".

Apollo is a male Active seen in "Getting Closer".

Cassandra is an Active mentioned in  "Getting Closer".

Hades is a male Active seen in "The Left Hand".

LA Dollhouse Staff

Adelle DeWitt
Adelle DeWitt (Olivia Williams) is the highest-ranking official at the Los Angeles Dollhouse. A British national, Adelle truly believes that what they do at the Dollhouse helps people. Prior to working in the Dollhouse, her job entailed growing human organs out of stem cells at a lab in her native England and later in Los Angeles.  Although Adelle is the head of her "House", she does answer to off-screen superiors, as the L.A. Dollhouse is just one of more than twenty worldwide with their headquarters in Tucson, Arizona. She is revealed to be "Miss Lonelyhearts" who has hired out Victor several times for romantic encounters to quell her intense loneliness. In "Epitaph One", Adelle has become more protective of the Actives, going as far as to challenge the C.E.O. of Rossum when he informs her that the company will start selling Actives to their wealthiest clients. Another flashback shows her living in the Dollhouse, with the other Actives (who have been restored with their original personalities) and has developed a profound bond with Topher, who has gone insane with guilt over the chaos the imprinting technology caused. Adelle has a drinking problem, rarely seen without a drink in season one. In "Stop-Loss", she is found passed out at her desk.

Boyd Langton
Boyd Langton (Harry J. Lennix), is introduced as a former cop who is working as a handler at the Dollhouse first assigned as Echo's handler. He has a strong, almost fatherly attachment to Echo. After Dominic is sent to the attic, Langton becomes the new head of security, though retaining a connection to Echo. He expresses doubts about the ethics of what the Dollhouse does with the Actives and is not afraid to share his reservations with the fellow staff, including DeWitt. In a future scene in "Epitaph One" (later shown in context in "Getting Closer"), it is revealed that Boyd is in a romantic relationship with Claire Saunders, and must leave the Dollhouse in a hurry, though promises to come back for her. Langton has a relationship with Saunders that is kept hidden from the employees of the Dollhouse. It is later revealed (via flashbacks in "Getting Closer" and "The Hollow Men") that he is one of the two founders of the Rossum Corporation. He joins a resistance group of the main L.A. Dollhouse characters and they storm into the base of the Rossum Corporation. There, he reveals the truth to the other members of his party. He also reveals that Claire/Whiskey has been reprogrammed with an altered copy of Clyde, Boyd's Rossum co-founder. However, Boyd is foiled when his mind is wiped to a blank doll state just before he can kill Echo. He is then strapped with dynamite and ordered to detonate a grenade. He does so, killing himself and apparently destroying all of Rossum's work.

Topher Brink
Christopher "Topher" Brink (Fran Kranz) is the scientist who operates the Dollhouse technology and uses it to imprint new personalities on the Actives.  He has stated that the technology takes imprints from existing people, which he then mixes and matches to create the desired imprint. A genius, Topher has a cocky, if quirky, attitude which puts him at odds with Ballard, who believes that Topher cannot completely wipe a person's soul from their body. In the DVD extra "Epitaph One" episode it is revealed that while he did not invent the technology, he improved the speed and viability of imprinting — something that makes him feel responsible and eventually drives him insane after the imprinting technology becomes weaponized. On his birthday, Topher is able to use an Active to goof off with in order to celebrate under the guise of an "anterior insular cortex diagnostic" – an indulgence Adelle allows him once a year.
Topher is revealed to have become even more insane by 2019 and forced to work for Rossum. It is revealed that he was forced to create a massive device that would wipe the entire planet. He later sacrificed himself to remove the imprints from everyone and restore the world to what it was before.

Paul Ballard
Paul Ballard (Tahmoh Penikett) is the ex-FBI special agent assigned to the Dollhouse case. While most in the Bureau view the case as a joke, he takes it seriously, to the point of obsession. Throughout the show, his main objective is to rescue Caroline. In Man on the Street, a mole in the Dollhouse secretly imprints Echo with a secret personality who informs Ballard that he must be discharged from the FBI in order to throw the Dollhouse off of his trail before he truly can uncover the truth of the organization.  He had become involved with his neighbor Mellie before discovering the Dollhouse imprinted her to spy on him. He then distances himself from her, using her vulnerability to follow her to the Dollhouse's location. In "Omega" he agrees to work for the Dollhouse in exchange for the freedom of Mellie, a.k.a. November (her doll designation). Ballard was wiped by Alpha in "A Love Supreme" and his body left on life support, however Topher is able to partially restore him in "The Attic" by converting him into an active and imprinting him with the scan Alpha took of him. However, due to Alpha's brutal treatment, parts of his brain have been permanently damaged, and Topher is forced to "rewire" his brain to function without them; at the cost of some other mental capacity, namely the connection he had with Echo. He was killed in the final episode when an unknown shooter shot him in the head while he was trying to help one of the survivors. His imprinted wedge was left by a redeemed Alpha and was later imprinted into Echo so they could be together.

Claire Saunders
Dr. Claire Saunders (Amy Acker) is the Actives' general physician. It is revealed in "Omega" that she was an Active, Whiskey.  Formerly the Dollhouse's most popular Doll, she was attacked by Alpha with a pair of scissors, causing extensive facial scars. Shortly afterwards, with the original Dr. Saunders killed by Alpha, Whiskey was imprinted with his personality and skill-set. Topher programmed the imprint to make her disagree with him so they would not "miss anything". Saunders does not wish to be imprinted with her original self, and in "Vows", leaves the dollhouse. The role of Claire Saunders was originally conceived for a woman in her 40s or 50s, but Whedon had worked with Acker on Angel and he decided she would be the best actress for the part; therefore Whedon adapted the character, despite initial reservations about casting too many Buffy and Angel alumni. Flashbacks in "Epitaph One" show that Dr. Saunders became romantically involved with Boyd Langton - a scene later shown in "Getting Closer" - and following the technological apocalypse and Topher's breakdown, acts as the Dollhouse's programmer. In the 2019 framing narrative for "Epitaph One" however, Dr. Saunders' persona has apparently faded away, leaving Whiskey with faint traces of Saunders' personality.

Ivy
Topher's assistant (Liza Lapira). While she is highly skilled and sees herself as his apprentice, Topher treats her more as a gofer, assigning her menial tasks such as fetching him snacks. She was framed by the NSA as the mole in the Dollhouse to hide Dominic, though her innocence is quickly found by an imprinted Echo.

Sophie Alvarez
Sophie Alvarez (Angel Desai) is a handler shown in two episodes. In "Omega" she is shown to have been the handler of Whiskey and in "Needs" she is attacked by Echo, who is trying to break into a gun cabinet.

Laurence Dominic
Laurence Dominic (Reed Diamond), head of security at the Dollhouse during most of the first season,  takes his job very seriously, but doesn't think very highly of the Dolls themselves, viewing them more as robots than humans. He attempts to kill Echo, and also suggests she be retired as an Active, and put into "the Attic". Later, while intoxicated, he attempts to apologize to Echo for his actions. Dominic is revealed to be an NSA agent spying on the Dollhouse and (after having his memories extracted by Topher) is sent to the Attic.

Later on, in the episode "The Attic", when Echo breaks through her looping nightmare, she re-encounters Dominic, who has conquered his own nightmare and is fighting a psychic assassin known as Arcane. Being convinced to join Echo, he frees Priya and Anthony, and ultimately traps Arcane, who is in fact Clyde; a founder of Rossum. After he explains the motives behind and the purpose of the Attic, Echo, Priya and Anthony leave while Clyde and Dominic decide to stay behind to free those trapped in the attic from their eternal nightmare.

However, during the next episode, Dominic frees himself from the attic, and works his way down to the corridors where Echo is allowing Anthony and Priya to leave the house, and warns her that Clyde is dead and Rossum is onto their plans. From the stress and shock that was required to break out, he collapses. The shock was significant, and he was expected not to survive unless he was placed in the attic again. Despite his objections he is prepped and assumed replaced.

In "Epitaph One", Dominic is shown to have been recently released from the Attic with his memory restored, shortly after imprinting technology starts being used as a weapon. He appears slightly unstable due to what was done to him since being sent to the Attic and taunts Adelle about the technology getting out of control. He is not seen again in the later flashbacks, nor does he appear in the future events of "Epitaph One" and "Epitaph Two". His fate is unknown.

Joe Hearn
Joe Hearn (Kevin Kilner) is Sierra's handler in the first six episodes, and was the handler to the previous Sierra. Joe Hearn is introduced as a less dedicated counterpart to Boyd Langton, and strongly dislikes Echo for her individualism and worries about her influence on Sierra. DeWitt eventually learns that Hearn raped Sierra in her blank state a number of times, and arranges Hearn's death by assigning him to assassinate "Mellie" (actually the active November), then activating November with a trigger phrase (revealing her as a sleeper), causing her to kill him.

Dr. Saunders
Dr. Saunders (Joe Howard) used to serve as the Actives' general physician. He was killed by Alpha, which caused Whiskey to become his replacement.

Other Rossum Employees

Bennett Halverson
Bennett Halverson (Summer Glau) used to serve as the scientist who worked for the Washington D.C. Dollhouse. She started working at the Rossum Corporation when she was in college rooming with Caroline, her first friend. Caroline stole both her and Bennett's folders from Rossum and Bennett found out. However, Bennett wanted to help, so the two went to the building to blow it up, but Caroline found some dolls and tried to stop the explosion. The room that Bennett was in exploded and her arm was trapped under debris and Caroline tried to help, but fled the scene.

The L.A. Dollhouse kidnaps Bennett in order to get her to restore Caroline's backup wedge. While she is trying, Dr. Saunders comes in and starts talking to her about her kiss with Topher. Dr. Saunders turns out to be a sleeper, and fatally shoots Bennett in the head, spraying blood onto Topher. The result of her death had a profound impact on Topher and eventually started the chain reaction that caused his insanity. A video of Bennett lecturing on imprinting helped Topher design the mass-wipe bomb that de-programmed everyone at the end of the series.

FBI Staff

Graham Tanaka
Graham Tanaka (Mark Sheppard) is an FBI agent highly critical of Ballard's assignment of the Dollhouse, believing it to be nothing more than an urban legend.

Loomis
Loomis (Aisha Hinds) is an FBI analyst and Ballard's ally within the Bureau while he's suspended. She provides him with FBI file access and information even though she is not fully convinced on the Dollhouse's existence.

Actuals
The "Actuals" are a group of resistance members in the year 2019. Calling themselves "actuals", which means they are people who have yet to be affected by the wireless imprinting occurring across the world which started a few years prior. They seek to find a cure to the imprinting which is causing chaos and madness to most of the world's population.

Mag
Mag (Felicia Day) (short for Maggie) is the leader of a ragtag group who calls themselves the "actuals", people who still have not been imprinted and retain their original personalities. In the year 2019, she leads a small group of "actuals" underground to the remains of the Los Angeles Dollhouse where they may find a cure to the memory imprinting across the world. After learning the truth of the Dollhouse, she and the remaining members begin their trek to find safe haven. Some months later, they later find Haven thanks to Echo and Ballard and she later takes part in the assault in L.A. to enter the Dollhouse. She was shot several times in both legs during the assault and becomes a wheelchair user. Due to her injuries, she is forced to stay in the Dollhouse, leaving the care of Iris to Zone. Before the final Imprint near the end, she reveals to Zone that before the chaos imprinting, she used to attend college at Berkeley and was dating a girl who was a classmate at the university.

Zone
Zone (Zack Ward) is one of the members of Mag's group. He is much more cautious about imprinted people and will not hesitate to kill them if they threaten the group. He is also the first person to find out about Iris' duplicity and tricks her into revealing her malicious intentions. Zone, with Mag and Iris/Caroline, begin their journey to find safe haven. He was captured by what was left of Rossum and was rescued by Echo and Ballard. Despite his protest he went along as a guide to the Dollhouse members through LA and Dollhouse LA, eventually helping in returning all those Imprinted to their original selves. Due to Mag's injuries, he was left with the task of protecting Iris, becoming her "handler". Before the final Imprint, he reveals to a surprised Mag that before the chaos imprinting, he was a landscape architect living in Pasadena and was married to a woman whom he hoped to start a family with.

Iris
Iris (Adair Tishler) is a young girl who recently joined Mag's group with her imprinted father Mr. Miller. However, it is later revealed that Iris is an imprinted human and actually faked a father-daughter relationship with Miller, which wasn't his real surname. Inside the remains of the Dollhouse, Iris begins killing off the survivors with the intention to leave the girl's body and find safe haven for herself. Zone discovers her duplicity and forces her into the imprint chair to upload Caroline Farrell's personality into her. At the series end, her Caroline imprint led the survivors to Haven and she along with the other imprinted are wiped thanks to Topher's machine.

References 

Dollhouse
Dollhouse
Characters created by Joss Whedon
Dollhouse
Dollhouse